William Riga is the current head coach for Holy Cross. Previously he was an associate head coach at Quinnipiac and helped the team reach the National Championship game in 2013 and 2016.

Career
Riga began his college career in 1992 after graduating from St. Mark's School. After playing just two games as a freshman, he became a fixture on the team a depth scorer for the next three seasons. In that time he helped the team reach the NCAA Tournament twice, making the national quarterfinals on both occasions. After graduating, Riga briefly played as a professional, retiring after just 7 games and immediately turning to coach.

Riga's first job was for the Boston Junior Bruins as both the team's assistant coach and director of recruitment. He spent most of seven seasons with the team before returning to the college ranks as an assistant under new head coach Nate Leaman at Union. He remained with the Dutchmen for five years before taking the same position at Quinnipiac. Riga became the team's primary recruiter in 2012 and the Bobcats jumped from the middle of ECAC Hockey straight to the top. That year Quinnipiac won 30 games for the first time and reached the national championship game where they were defeated by in-state rival Yale. Over the course of the succeeding seven seasons, Quinnipiac remained one of the top programs in the country, finishing atop their conference four times and making five further NCAA tournament appearances.

After the resignation of David Berard in 2021, Holy Cross hired Riga as the program's 7th head coach.

Statistics

Regular season and playoffs

Head coaching record

References

External links

1974 births
Living people
Ice hockey coaches from Massachusetts
People from Westborough, Massachusetts
American men's ice hockey forwards
Sioux City Musketeers players
UMass Lowell River Hawks men's ice hockey players
El Paso Buzzards players
Holy Cross Crusaders men's ice hockey coaches
Ice hockey players from Massachusetts